Alison Cheveley Shrubsole CBE (7 April 1925 - 4 October 2002) was a British educationist and university administrator. 

She served for 14 years as Principal of Homerton College, Cambridge from 1971 to 1985. Prior to this she was Principal of Philippa Fawcett College, and before this Principal of Machakos Training College in East Africa. She graduated from Royal Holloway, University of London with a degree in history, before studying at the University of London's Institute of Education (now part of University College, London).

She was a Fellow of Hughes Hall, Cambridge, was appointed a Commander of the Most Excellent Order of the British Empire in 1982, and was awarded an honorary degree by the Open University in 1985.

References

 

1925 births
 2002 deaths
Alumni of Royal Holloway, University of London
Alumni of University College London
Commanders of the Order of the British Empire